A Registered Accessibility Specialist (RAS) is a professional licensed by the Texas Department of Licensing and Regulation to determine if a part of the built environment (building, park, sidewalk, parking lot) is compliant with the Texas Architectural Barriers Act and the Texas Accessibility Standards (TAS).  A RAS reviews construction documents to determine accessible design and inspects finished buildings to verify accessible construction.

External links
 http://www.tdlr.texas.gov/ab/abtas.htm
 http://www.gov.texas.gov/organization/disabilities
 https://www.jacobsaccessibilitygroup.com/post/what-is-a-registered-accessibility-specialist

Disability rights